The 1997–98 Xavier Musketeers men's basketball team represented Xavier University from Cincinnati, Ohio in the 1997–98 season. Led by head coach Skip Prosser, the Musketeers finished 22–8 (11–5 A-10) in the regular season, and won the Atlantic 10 tournament. In the NCAA tournament, the No. 6 seed Musketeers were upset in the opening round by No. 11 seed Washington, 69–68.

Roster

Schedule and results

|-
!colspan=9 style=| Non-Conference Regular season

|-
!colspan=9 style=| Atlantic 10 Regular season

|-
!colspan=9 style=| Atlantic 10 Tournament

|-
!colspan=9 style=| NCAA Tournament

Rankings

References

Xavier
Xavier Musketeers men's basketball seasons
Xavier